UnderJams are a pull-on style diaper made by Pampers for managing bedwetting. They are similar to GoodNites. "UnderJams" claim to be softer and quieter than GoodNites. The package states that they will only fit children up to 85 lbs. Also, because of their low waist, they are hardly visible under pajamas. They were discontinued in 2020 or August 5th 2020 or April 10th 2021 in favor of the new Procter & Gamble product, Ninjamas.

Origins
UnderJams were introduced in 2008 in the US, as a direct competitor to GoodNites.

Designs
For boys, UnderJams initially had a pastel green color, with some assorted designs. For girls, they were a pastel purple color, again with limited designs, as opposed to the GoodNites which are white but have many designs. 

Recently, the designs for both genders have been updated with more brightly colored designs.

Sizes
Pampers UnderJams came in 2 sizes; small/medium and large/extra large the weight ranges for which are specified below.

Diaper brands
Toilet training